DFC was an American hip hop duo composed of Flint, Michigan natives Alpha "Al" Breed and Bobby "T-Dub" Thompson. They were closely associated with MC Breed who was also Al's cousin.

DFC stands for Da Funk Clan.

MC Breed and DFC released their collaborative debut album on November 11, 1991 entitled MC Breed & DFC, which charted at 142 on the Billboard 200 and featured their most successful single, "Ain't No Future in Yo' Frontin'".

After MC Breed & DFC, DFC signed with Atlantic Records and were placed on their subsidiary  Big Beat Records. They then released 1994's Things in tha Hood which became their most successful album, peaking at 71 on the Billboard 200 and spawning the singles "Caps Get Peeled" and "Thing in tha Hood". They followed up with 1997's The Whole World's Rotten, but disbanded in 1999 after appearing on MC Breed's It's All Good.

Discography

Studio albums

Collaboration albums

Compilation albums
The Hits with MC Breed (2007)

Singles

References

American hip hop groups
Midwest hip hop groups
Musical groups established in 1991
Musical groups disestablished in 1999
Musical groups from Flint, Michigan
American musical duos
Hip hop duos
Gangsta rap groups
G-funk groups
1991 establishments in Michigan